Kaplan MT or Harimau is a lightweight tank jointly developed by Turkish manufacturer FNSS and Indonesian manufacturer PT Pindad. The development program name for the tank is Modern Medium Weight Tank (MMWT). The tank itself is called Kaplan MT by Turkey and Harimau by Indonesia, both meaning "tiger".

History
The governments of Indonesia and Turkey first agreed in May 2015 to jointly develop the MMWT for the Indonesian Army at a reported cost of 30 million US dollars. The development phase of the program was expected to take up to 37 months, with the first prototype being built in Turkey, and the second in Indonesia. The intellectual property of the design was agreed upon to be shared between the two governments.

On 1 November 2016, during the 2016 Indo Defence expo, the first model of the tank was unveiled, along with some technical specifications. Most notably, the vehicles overall weight was reported to be around 35 tonnes, and the main armament would be provided by a Belgian-made turret developed by CMI Defence featuring a 105 mm rifled barrel, capable of firing a wide range of projectiles.

On 9 May 2017 at the IDEF 2017 expo, the first prototype of the tank was revealed. The tank can be fitted with either a Cockerill XC-8 105mm concept turret or Cockerill 3105 modular turret. Additionally, the tank utilizes modular armor, allowing for quick replacement upon damage.

On 5 September 2018, the general manager of FNSS told Turkey's Anadolu Agency that the tank had passed months of required qualification tests for the Indonesian Army, and was ready for mass production. He stated that the first batch of 20 to 25 tanks could be ordered as early as late 2018, and that the full number of tanks to be produced would likely fall between 200 and 400.

On 7 February 2020, it was announced that mass production of the MMWT has started.

In IDEF 2021 (17–20 August 2021), the production model of Harimau / Kaplan MT is revealed. Many improvements were made to the tank during the transition from prototype to mass production. In this context, driver visibility and handling ergonomics have been improved. The body design was perfected in line with the feedback from the end user. Based on the experience gained from the tests, improvements were made in the tower system, power transmission group, cooling system and suspension system.

One of the prototype tanks underwent series of firing tests on 24–25 February 2022 at Army Infantry Education Center Cipatat, West Bandung Regency as part of the Factory Acceptance Trials (FAT). The tank fired several rounds of HEP-T (High Explosive Plastic Tracer) and TPCSDS-T (Target Practice Cone Stabilized Discarding Sabot with Tracer) at 4x4 meters target from range of 1,250 meters in various firing positions. The tank then underwent mobility tests at a section of Padalarang-Bandung toll highway and at PT Pindad facility. On 15 March 2022, a ceremony was held to mark the official completion of the first batch of 10 tanks produced at FNSS facility in Turkey. The remaining 8 turretless hull were to be sent to Indonesia after the ceremony for final turret assembly and delivery to the Indonesian Army. The second batch production of 8 tanks will be built by PT Pindad in Indonesia with FNSS assistance.

Design

Armament 
The MMWT is equipped with a Cockerill CT-CV 105HP (High Pressure) 105 mm rifled gun manufactured by CMI (Cockerill Maintenance & Ingenierie SA Defense), with the barrel mounting a bore evacuator and thermal jacket. The turret is equipped with an autoloader and can be rotated 360 degrees both electronically and mechanically, with a maximum elevation/depression of 42 up to -10 degrees, and it's equipped with Gyro Stabilizer and Firing Control System. It's also equipped with an IFF system, Hunter Killer System for target selection, and Auto Target Locking System to assist the Gunner.

Armor 
The hull armor of MMWT is using modular armor. It is categorized as STANAG 4569 level 4 protection, which means the tank can withstand 14.5×114mm AP rounds at 200 meters with 911 m/s velocity. The underbelly of the tank uses V-hull, able to withstand 10 kg AT mine under the tracks and under the center. Due to modularity, the armor can be augmented to level 5 protection (withstand 25 mm APDS-T at 500 m with 1258 m/s velocity) without increasing the volume of the tank, with the frontal arc able to withstand 30 mm rounds.

Mobility 
Dynamic and mobility test taken in 7–16 August 2018 to prove the specification design. The tank uses a Caterpillar C13 diesel engine generating 711 hp, coupled with Allison/Caterpillar X300 transmission. During the test the tank is able to reach 78 km/h in road speed. The prototype is able to cross 2 m trench and 0.9 m vertical obstacle.

Defensive Systems 
The MMWT's survivability has been further strengthened. A modular PULAT Active Protection System joint-developed by ASELSAN and TÜBİTAK SAGE can be integrated. This ensures the tank's defensive capabilities against projectiles at all-angles.

Operators

Future operators

 : 18 units ordered in 2019 and will be delivered in 2023.

Potential operators

 : Expressed interest in November 2018.
: Expressed interest in November 2019.

Failed bids 
 : Expressed interest in September 2018 but later opt for VT-5 light tank.
 : Expressed interest in September 2018. As early as August 2020, Department of National Defense (Philippines) has released Notice of Award favoring Sabrah  light tank over the Kaplan MT / Harimau.

See also

Contemporary competitors
 Griffin II
 Type 15 tank, or VT-5 (export model)
 Sabrah light tank

Tanks with similar firepower
 CV90105
 K21-105
 M8 Armored Gun System
 2S25 Sprut-SD
 TAM
 WPB Anders

References

Post–Cold War military equipment of Indonesia
Tanks of Turkey
Post–Cold War light tanks
Medium tanks
Military vehicles introduced in the 2010s
Military vehicles of Indonesia
Indonesia–Turkey relations